Below is list of exonyms for places which have a different name in Serbian.

Albania 

Shqipëria : Албанија (Albanija)
 Ballsh : Балш (Balš)
 Durrës : Драч (Drač)
Fier : Фир (Fir)
 Kukës : Кукеш (Kukeš), Кукуш (Kukuš), Кукс (Kuks)
 Gjirokastër : Ђирокастра (Đirokastra)
Korçë : Корча (Korča), Горица (Gorica)
 Lezhë : Љеш (Lješ), Љежа (Lježa)
 Shkodër : Скадар (Skadar)
 Tiranë : Тирана (Tirana)
 Voskopojë : Москопоље (Moskopolje)
Vlorë : Валона (Valona)

Austria 

Österreich : Аустрија (Austrija)
 Burgenland : Градишће (Gradišće)
 Graz : Грац (Grac)
 Eisenstadt : Жељезно (Željezno)
 Klagenfurt : Целовац (Celovac)
 Linz : Линц (Linc) Salzburg : Салцбург (Salcburg) Villach : Бељак (Beljak) Wien : Беч (Beč) Bulgaria Balgariya (България) : Бугарска (Bugarska) Blagoevgrad (Благоевград) : Благојевград (Blagojevgrad) China Zhōngguó (中国) : Кина (Kina) Beijing (北京市) : Пекинг (Peking) Cyprus Kýpros (Κύπρος) or Kıbrıs : Кипар (Kipar) Lefkosía (Λευκωσία) or Lefkoşa : Никозија (Nikozija) Czech Republic Česko : Чешка (Češka) Praha : Праг (Prag) Denmark Danmark : Данска (Danska) København : Копенхаген (Kopenhagen) Finland Suomi : Финска (Finska) Helsinki : Хелсинки (Helsinki) France France : Француска (Francuska) Marseille : Марсељ (Marselj)
 Nice : Ница (Nica)
 Paris : Париз (Pariz)

Germany 

Deutschland : Немачка (Nemačka), Њемачка (Njemačka), Нијемачка (Nijemačka)
 Düsseldorf : Диселдорф (Diseldorf)
 Köln : Келн (Keln)
 Leipzig : Лајпциг (Lajpcig)
 München : Минхен (Minhen)
 Nürnberg : Нирнберг (Nirnberg)
 Stuttgart : Штутгарт (Štutgart)

Greece 

Elláda (Ελλάδα) or Ellás (Ἑλλάς) : Грчка (Grčka)
 Athina (Αθήνα) : Атина (Atina)
 Édessa : (Έδεσσα): Воден (Voden)
 Florina (Φλώρινα) : Лерин (Lerin)
Giannitsa (Γιαννιτσά): Пазар (Pazar) Јениџе Вардар (Jenidže Vardar)
Ioannina: (Ιωάννινα): Јањина (Janjina)
Kastoria (Καστοριά): Костур (Kostur)
 Kerkyra (Κέρκυρα) : Крф (Krf)
Kilkis (Κιλκίς): Кукуш (Kukuš)
 Korinthos (Κόρινθος) : Коринт (Korint)
 Kozani (Κοζάνη) : Кожани (Kožani)
Piraeus (Πειραιάς): Пиреј (Pirej)
Polykastro (Πολύκαστρο): Карасули (Karasuli)
Ptolemaida (Πτολεμαΐδα): Кајлар (Kajlar), Кајлари (Kajlari), Каљар (Kaljar)
 Serres (Σέρρες): Cep (Ser)
Sidirokastro (Σιδηρόκαστρο): Валовиште (Valovište)
Thessaloniki (Θεσσαλονίκη) : Солун (Solun)
Veria (Βέροια): Бер (Ber)

Hungary 

Magyarország: Мађарска (Mađarska)
Budapest : Будимпешта (Budimpešta)
 Buda : Будим (Budim)
 Pest : Пешта (Pešta)
 Debrecen : Дебрецин (Debrecin)
 Deszk : Деска (Deska)
 Eger : Јегра (Jegra)
 Esztergom : Острогон (Ostrogon)
 Győr : Ђур (Đur)
 Hercegszántó : Сантово(Santovo)
 Komárom : Коморан (Komoran)
 Lórév : Ловра (Lovra)
 Makó : Мако (Mako)
 Nagykanizsa : Велика Кањижа (Velika Kanjiža)
 Nyíregyháza : Њиређхаза (Njiređhaza)
 Pécs : Печуј (Pečuj)
 Ráckeve : Српски Ковин (Srpski Kovin)
 Szeged : Сегедин (Segedin)
 Székesfehérvár : Стони Београд (Stoni Beograd)
 Szentendre : Сентандреја (Sentandreja)
 Szigetvár : Сигетвар (Sigetvar)
 Szőreg : Сириг (Sirig)
 Veszprém : Весприм (Vesprim)
 Villány : Вилањ (Vilanj)

India 

Bhārat : Индија (Indija)
 Mumbai : Бoмбај (Bombaj)

Italy 

Italia : Италија (Italija)
 Gorizia : Горица (Gorica)
 Florence : Фиренца (Firenca)
 Naples : Напуљ (Napulj)
 Ravenna : Равена (Ravena)
 Rome : Рим (Rim)
 Trieste : Трст (Trst)
 Venice : Венеција (Venecija), Млеци (Mleci)

Japan 

Nihon or Nippon (日本) : Јапан (Japan)
 Tokyo (東京) : Токио (Tokio)

Luxembourg 

Lëtzebuerg : Луксембург (Luksemburg)
 Lëtzebuerg : Луксембург (Luksemburg)

Macedonia 

Makedonija (Македонија) : Македонија (Makedonija)
 Aračinovo (Арачиново) : Арачиново (Aračinovo)
 Bitola (Битола) : Битољ (Bitolj)
 Gevgelija (Гевгелија) : Ђевђелија (Đevđelija)
 Kočani (Кочани) : Кочане (Kočane)
 Resen (Ресен) : Ресан (Resan)
 Skopje (Скопје) : Скопље (Skoplje)

Moldova 

Moldova : Молдавија (Moldavija)
 Chişinău : Кишињев (Kišinjev)

Netherlands 

Nederland : Холандија (Holandija), Низоземска (Nizozemska)
 Den Haag : Хаг (Hag)

Portugal 

Portugal : Португалија (Portugalija), Португал (Portugal)
 Lisboa : Лисабон (Lisabon)

Romania 

România : Румунија (Rumunija)
 București : Букурешт (Bukurešt)
 Caransebeş : Себеш (Sebeš)
 Caraşova : Карашево (Karaševo)
 Cluj-Napoca : Клуж (Kluž)
 Ineu : Јенопољ (Jenopolje)
 Jimbolia : Жомбољ (Žombolj)
 Lipova : Липа (Lipa)
 Lugoj : Лугош (Lugoš)
 Lupac : Лупак (Lupak)
 Oradea : Велики Варадин (Veliki Varadin)
 Orşova : Оршава (Oršava)
 Reşiţa : Решица (Rešica)
 Sibiu : Сибињ (Sibinј)
 Socol : Сокол (Sokol), Соколовац (Sokolovac)
 Svinița : Свињица (Svinjica)
 Timișoara: Темишвар (Temišvar)

Russia 

Rossiya (Россия) : Русија (Rusija)
 Kaliningrad (Калининград) : Калињинград (Kalinjingrad)
 Sankt-Peterburg (Санкт-Петербург) : Санкт Петербург (Sankt Peterburg), Петроград (Petrograd)

Singapore 
 Singapore : Сингапур (Singapur)

Slovakia 

Slovensko : Словачка (Slovačka)
 Komárno : Коморан (Komoran)

Slovenia 

Slovenija : Словенија (Slovenija)
 Koper : Копар (Kopar)

Spain 

España : Шпанија (Španija)
 A Coruña : Коруња (Korunјa)

Sweden 

Sverige : Шведскa (Švedska)
 Gävle : Јевле (Jevle)
 Göteborg : Гетеборг (Geteborg)
 Jönköping : Јенћепинг (Jenćeping)
 Linköping : Линћепинг (Linćeping)
 Malmö : Малме (Malme)
 Stockholm : Стокхолм (Stokholm)
 Umeå : Умео (Umeo)
 Västerås : Вестерос (Vesteros)
 Växjö : Векше (Vekše)
 Örebro : Еребро (Erebro)
 Örnsköldsvik : Ерншелдсвик (Ernšeldsvik)

Switzerland 

Schweiz, Suisse or Svizzera : Швајцарска (Švajcarska)
 Genève : Женева (Ženeva)
 Lausanne : Лозана (Lozana)
 Zürich : Цирих (Cirih)

Turkey 

Türkiye : Турска (Turska)
 İstanbul : Истамбул (Istambul), Истанбул (Istanbul), Цариград (Carigrad), Константинопољ (Konstantinopolj), Стамбол (Stambol)
Edirne: Једрене (Jedrene)
Trabzon: Трапезунт (Trapezunt)

Ukraine 

Ukrayina (Україна) : Украјина (Ukrajina)
 Chernivtsi (Чернівці́) : Черновице (Černovice)
 Lviv (Львів) : Лавов (Lavov)

United States 

United States of America : Сједињене Америчке Државе (Sjedinjene Američke Države)

See also 
 List of European exonyms

References 
 Jovanović, Goran. Географски атлас [Картографска грађа]. Интерсистем-картографија, 2010.  

Serbian language
Lists of exonyms